= Angela Woodiwiss =

South African professor and physiotherapist

- Citizenship: South Africa
- Occupations: Researcher, Academic
- Title: Prof

Academic background
- Education: PhD
- Alma mater: University of the Witwatersrand
- Thesis: (1996)

Academic work
- Discipline: Physiotherapy
- Institutions: University of the Witwatersrand

Angela J. Woodiwiss is a South African researcher, physiotherapist and university professor at the University of the Witwatersrand, Johannesburg, South Africa.

== Education ==
Woodiwiss has a Bachelors degree in Physiotherapy, BSc(Physiotherapy) in 1986 from University of the Witwatersrand, Master of Medical Science, MSc(Med) and she got her PhD in Physiology in 1996 from University of the Witwatersrand.

== Career ==
Woodiwiss has had the served in various capacities in both the field of academic and research:

=== University of the Witwatersrand ===
- Head of the Molecular and Cellular Laboratory
- Co-director of the Cardiovascular Pathophysiology and Genomics Research Unit in the School of Physiology
- Professor of Physiology since 2010

She has a fellowship from the University of Massachusetts in 1997.

== Publications ==
- Differential Association Between Ten Indices of Insulin Resistance and End-Organ Damage in a Community of African Ancestry in Africa
- Diabetic Nephropathy-Associated Impaired Aortic Function Is Not Mediated by Mean Arterial Pressure and Its Determinants
- Attenuated Relationships between Indexes of Volume Overload and Atrial Natriuretic Peptide in Uncontrolled, Sustained Volume-Dependent Primary Hypertension
- Lack of impact of HIV status on carotid intima media thickness in a cohort of stroke patients in South Africa

== Awards and recognition ==
- Faculty Research Prize in 2003 for the most prestigious publication in the Faculty of Health Sciences
- Friedel Sellschop Research Award (prestigious award from 2000−2002
- Awards for the best (2005, 2001, 1989) or second-best (1999, 1985) oral presentation at a congress
- AstraZeneca Cardiovascular Research Grant in 2002 and 2003
- University Council overseas fellowship in 1997.

== Society and fellowships ==
Woodiwiss is a member of several national and international societies, organizations and fellowships where she serve in various roles.

- Fellow of Physiological Society of Southern Africa
- Past President of Southern African Hypertension Society (SAHS)
- South African Country Leader for May Measurement Month (an international hypertension awareness campaign)
- Council Member of World Hypertension League
- Board Member of SAHS
- Director of Cardiovascular Pathophysiology and Genomics Research Unit, University of the Witwatersrand.
- Elected as a Fellow of the Africa Academy of Sciences in 2022
